Adventures in Paradise is the debut studio album by R&B singer  Christopher Williams. Released in 1989, the album charted at number twenty-three on the Billboard Top Soul Albums chart.

Track listing
"Talk to Myself"  4:20 	
"Sexy Sex"  3:42 	
"Never Let Our Love Die"  4:30 	
"(Lift You Up) Turn Your Hurt Around"  5:14 	
"Paradise"  4:38 	
"Promises, Promises" 	5:20 	
"One Girl"  3:20 	
"If That's What You Want"  5:15 	
"I'm Your Present"  5:40 	
"Always & Forever"  6:24 	
"Lover Come Back"  4:14 	
"Sweet Memories"  4:22

Charts

Weekly charts

Year-end charts

Singles

External links
 Christopher Williams-Adventures In Paradise at Discogs

References

1989 debut albums
Geffen Records albums
Christopher Williams (singer) albums
Albums produced by Gerald Levert